A Matter of Faith is a 2014 American Christian drama film directed by Rich Christiano and starring Harry Anderson (in his final role), Jordan Trovillion, Jay Pickett, and Clarence Gilyard. The film was released into theaters on October 17, 2014 by Five & Two Pictures. The film follows a Christian student (played by Trovillion) and her father (Pickett) who are challenged by a biology professor (Anderson) who teaches evolution.

Plot

Rachel Whitaker has been raised as a Christian by her loving parents (her father is a minister). However, after she leaves for her freshman year of college, she begins to be influenced by her biology professor, Dr. Kaman whose charisma and light-hearted approach make him popular with the students. He teaches that complex life forms evolved from simpler life forms and that the Biblical theory of creation is not a considerable alternative. Rachel's father Stephen is concerned by the change in his daughter's personality and beliefs, and goes to confront the arrogant professor, finding himself challenged to a debate much to the embarrassment of his daughter. As he prepares, Stephen is approached by a sympathetic student who tells him to go to the university to see a former professor named Portland, who was fired years before at Kaman's behest for teaching Biblical theory to his students. Portland initially rebuffs efforts to "get him back in the game". On the night of the debate, Kaman seems to be swaying the audience when Portland suddenly appears and confronts his old nemesis at the movie's conclusion.

Cast

Harry Anderson as Professor Marcus Kaman
Jordan Trovillion as Rachel Whitaker
Jay Pickett as Stephen Whitaker
Clarence Gilyard as Professor Joseph Portland
Chandler Macocha as Evan Carlson
Justin Brandt as Jason
Barrett Carnahan as Tyler Mathis
Stephanie Shemanski as Ally
Sarab Kamoo as Kimberly Whitaker
Scott Alan Smith as Phil Jamison

Reception
A Matter of Faith was initially released to 25 movie theaters and its widest release was to 52 theaters.

Common Sense Media gave the film a one out of five rating, criticizing its "clear agenda" and "clichéd plotting".

The Young Earth creationist and Christian apologetics organization Answers in Genesis (AiG) strongly endorsed and promoted the film. Other prominent Creationists who endorsed the film included Ray Comfort, founder and CEO of Living Waters Ministries, Tim Wildmon, President of the American Family Association, Gary Bates, CEO of Creation Ministries International, and Kent Hovind.

The Dove Foundation gave the film a rating of five out of five dove seals, writing that "This quality movie features solid acting including two veterans, Harry Anderson and Clarence Gilyard."

References

External links
 
 

2014 drama films
American drama films
Evolution in popular culture
Films about evangelicalism
American independent films
Works about creationism
Young Earth creationism
2010s English-language films
2010s American films